Transmutations is the fourth full-length studio album by Chicago-based progressive metal band Yakuza. It was released on August 7, 2007 by Prosthetic Records.

Track listing
"Meat Curtains" - 6:50
"Egocide" - 7:41
"Congestive Art-Failure" - 3:38
"Praying For Asteroids" - 2:57
"Raus" - 6:48
"Steal The Fire" - 2:16
"The Blinding" - 6:10
"Existence Into Oblivion" - 4:46
"Perception Management" - 7:21
"Black Market Liver" - 5:05
"Zombies" - 6:54

Personnel
 Bruce Lamont - saxophone, vocals
 James Staffel - drums
 Matt McClelland - guitar, vocals
 John E. Bomher - bass guitar

Additional
 Michael Zerang - percussion
 Hamid Drake - percussion

References

2007 albums
Yakuza (band) albums
Prosthetic Records albums